Lord Gifford may refer to:

 Adam Gifford, Lord Gifford (1820–1887), Scottish advocate and judge, Senator of the College of Justice
One of the Barons Gifford:
 Robert Gifford, 1st Baron Gifford (1779–1826), English lawyer, judge and politician, Master of the Rolls from 1824 to 1826
 Robert Gifford, 2nd Baron Gifford (1817–1872)
 Edric Gifford, 3rd Baron Gifford (1849–1911), English recipient of the Victoria Cross
 Edgar Gifford, 4th Baron Gifford (1857–1937)
 Charles Gifford, 5th Baron Gifford (1899–1961)
 Anthony Gifford, 6th Baron Gifford (born 1940), English barrister, campaigner for reparations for slavery

See also 
 Baron Gifford